In wireless technology, handover keying (Hokey) refers to maintaining a secure connection seamlessly while migrating from one wireless network to another.

External links
 IETF Working Group
 Interview with Russ Housley, chair of the Internet Engineering Task Force

Wireless networking